Sir Edward Birkbeck Wakefield, 1st Baronet,  (24 July 1903 – 14 January 1969) was a British civil servant and Conservative Party politician.

Wakefield was born 24 July 1903 in Kendal the son of Roger William Wakefield. He was educated at Haileybury and at Trinity College, Cambridge, he joined the Indian Civil Service in 1927 and served in Punjab, Rajputana, Kathiawar, Baluchistan, Central India, Tibet and the Persian Gulf. He was Chief Minister of Kalat State 1933–1936, of Nabha State 1939–1941 and of Rewa State 1943–1945, and was Joint Secretary, Political Department, Delhi, 1946–1947. He was awarded a bronze medal of the Royal Humane Society in 1936.

He was elected as the  Member of Parliament (MP) for West Derbyshire in 1950, holding the seat until 1962. He held a series of appointments as a whip, first as Assistant Whip, 1954–1956; then as a Lord Commissioner of the Treasury, 1956–1958; Comptroller of Her Majesty's Household, 1958–1959; Vice-Chamberlain of the Household, 1959–1960; and Treasurer of the Household, 1960–1962.

He resigned from the House of Commons in 1962, when he was appointed as Commissioner for Malta, 1962–64, becoming High Commissioner 1964–1965.

He was appointed a Companion of the Order of the Indian Empire  in 1945, and was created a baronet, of Kendal in the County of Westmorland, in 1962. His brother, Wavell Wakefield, 1st Baron Wakefield of Kendal, was also a Conservative politician. Wakefield died in January 1969, aged 65, and was succeeded in the baronetcy by his son Humphry.

References

External links 
 
Obituary of Lalage, Lady Wakefield (1906–2001), Sir Edward's widow. Daily Telegraph, 31 October 2001.

|-

1903 births
1969 deaths
Baronets in the Baronetage of the United Kingdom
Companions of the Order of the Indian Empire
Conservative Party (UK) MPs for English constituencies
People educated at Haileybury and Imperial Service College
Alumni of Trinity College, Cambridge
Indian Civil Service (British India) officers
Members of the Parliament of the United Kingdom for constituencies in Derbyshire
Treasurers of the Household
UK MPs 1950–1951
UK MPs 1951–1955
UK MPs 1955–1959
UK MPs 1959–1964
High Commissioners of the United Kingdom to Malta
Ministers in the Eden government, 1955–1957
Ministers in the Macmillan and Douglas-Home governments, 1957–1964
Indian Political Service officers
Edward